Gulden is the historical German and Dutch term for gold coin (from Middle High German  "golden penny" and Middle Dutch  "golden florin"), equivalent to the English term guilder.

Gulden, Gülden, Guldens or Gulden's may also refer to:

Coins or currencies
 Guilder, for both the gold & currency gulden
 For the gold gulden:
Guilder#gold guilder
Rhenish gulden
Reichsgulden (disambiguation), one of two 16th-century coins of the Holy Roman Empire
Goldgulden: the official "gold Gulden" (as opposed to the silver Guldengroschen) during the 16th century
Guldengroschen (Silbergulden): a silver coin defined as having the same value as an actual Gulden
 For European currencies named gulden excluding Switzerland:
Guilder
Dutch gulden
Austro-Hungarian gulden (1754-1892) 
South German gulden
 For currencies identical to the South German gulden:
Baden gulden (1754-1873)
Bavarian gulden
Württemberg gulden
For Swiss currencies named gulden:
Fribourg gulden
Luzern gulden
Neuchâtel gulden
Schwyz gulden
 Other:
Danzig gulden (1923–1939)
Florin (gulden in English)
Hungarian forint (gulden in Hungarian)
Netherlands Indies gulden
Netherlands New Guinean gulden
Polish zloty (gulden in Polish)

People
Gülden Kayalar, Turkish volleyball player
Brad Gulden, former Major League Baseball player
Gro Gulden, Norwegian mycologist
Bilal Gülden, Turkish footballer
Gülden, Turkish singer

Other
Gulden's, mustard brand named after its creator Charles Gulden
Guldens, Pennsylvania, an unincorporated community in Adams County
Gulden Draak, a dark Belgian beer
't Gulden Zeepaert, a ship belonging to the Dutch East India Company

Turkish-language surnames